Panaca is an unincorporated town in eastern Lincoln County, Nevada, United States, on State Route 319, about  east of U.S. Route 93, near the border with Utah. As of the 2010 census, it had a population of 963. It is one of only two cities in Nevada that prohibits gambling, the other being Boulder City.

History

The area that was to become the Panaca settlement was explored by Mormons in 1857. Brigham Young dispatched the explorers in order to locate a potential refuge in case of a U.S. military campaign against Utah. The location was selected due to the Meadow Valley oasis at the headwaters of the Muddy River. Mormon scouts began irrigation ditches and started fields, but the site was soon deserted after the feared violence never materialized. Panaca was the first permanent settlement by European Americans in southern Nevada. It was founded as a Mormon colony in 1864. It began as part of Washington County, Utah, but the congressional redrawing of boundaries in 1866 shifted Panaca into Nevada. It is the only community in Nevada to be "dry" (forbidding the sale of alcoholic beverages), and the only community in Nevada, besides Boulder City, that prohibits gambling.

Coke ovens here once produced charcoal for the smelters in nearby Bullionville (now a ghost town), but the town's economy is predominantly agricultural.

The name "Panaca" comes from the Southern Paiute word Pan-nuk-ker, which means "metal, money, wealth". William Hamblin, a Mormon missionary to the Paiutes, established the Panacker Ledge (Panaca Claim) silver mine there in 1864.

Geography

Demographics

Attractions
Panaca is near Cathedral Gorge State Park.

The following Nevada historical markers have been placed in Panaca:

 Panaca (#39)
 Panaca Mercantile Store (#93)
 Panaca Spring (#160)
 Panaca Ward Chapel (#182)

Panaca celebrates Pioneer Day on the Saturday closest to July 24. This coincides with the Utah holiday commemorating the arrival of the Mormon pioneers in the Salt Lake Valley.

See also

References

Further reading

 
 Republished in

External links

 Official website for Lincoln County
 Panaca's web page from the Nevada Commission on Tourism
 Panaca's page from the Lincoln Communities Action Team
 Panaca news from the Lincoln County Record newspaper

Census-designated places in Lincoln County, Nevada
Census-designated places in Nevada
Unincorporated towns in Nevada
Populated places established in 1864